The Women's omnium was held on 18–19 October 2014. 17 riders competed across six events.

Results

Scratch race
Standings after 1 event.

Individual pursuit
Standings after 2 events.

Elimination race
Standings after 3 events.

500m time trial
Standings after 4 events.

Flying lap
Standings after 5 events.

Points race and final standings
Riders' points from the previous 5 events were carried into the points race, in which the final standings were decided.

References

Women's omnium
European Track Championships – Women's omnium